Aleksandr Yegorovich Golovnya (born 27 October 1998) is a Russian football player. He plays for FC Saturn Ramenskoye.

Club career
He made his debut in the Russian Professional Football League for FC Solyaris Moscow on 2 October 2016 in a game against FC Torpedo Vladimir.

He made his Russian Football National League debut for FC Tyumen on 16 September 2017 in a game against FC Dynamo Saint Petersburg.

On 7 August 2020, he joined Russian Premier League club FC Tambov on a season-long loan. He made his Russian Premier League debut for Tambov on 22 August 2020 in a game against FC Zenit Saint Petersburg. His loan was terminated by Tambov on 9 October 2020.

References

External links
 
 
 

1998 births
Footballers from Moscow
Living people
Russian footballers
Association football defenders
FC Solyaris Moscow players
FC Strogino Moscow players
FC Tyumen players
FC Tambov players
FC Noah players
FC Saturn Ramenskoye players
Russian Premier League players
Russian First League players
Russian Second League players
Armenian Premier League players
Russian expatriate footballers
Expatriate footballers in Armenia
Russian expatriate sportspeople in Armenia